Hænsa-Þóris saga ("The Saga of Hen-Thorir") is one of the sagas of Icelanders.

Plot
It tells the story of Hænsa-Þórir (means "a hen"), a poor and unpopular man who acquires wealth as a merchant and manages to buy land. In the saga the upstart is compared negatively to his neighbours, who come from a more solid background; he causes strife between them. Eventually Hænsa-Þórir refuses to sell the neighbours hay for the winter. When they take the hay anyway, he burns them alive in their farmstead. A vendetta ensues in which Hænsa-Þórir is killed and beheaded; the neighbours then seal their differences with a marriage between their families.

Themes
The saga highlights aspects of Icelandic culture, such as hospitality to guests and travellers, (expected) generosity to one's neighbours, and the need to gather support of a chieftain in order to obtain justice. Ari Þorgilsson mentions the events in his Íslendingabók in connection with a change in Icelandic law, whereby a legal complaint was no longer to be brought to the closest Thing (assembly) but to the Quarter Thing. It has also been suggested that Hænsa-Þóris saga was written in response to a change in the law originating from King Magnus VI of Norway. According to the new law, a farmer was obliged to sell his neighbours hay if they were in great need. If he refused to sell the hay, he had to pay a fine, and if he resisted with force, his neighbours could attack him in turn without committing a crime. This was a novelty in Icelandic jurisprudence, and a formal objection was raised against it at the Althing in 1281. According to this theory, the saga was written as propaganda in favour of the new law.

References

External links
Proverbs in Hœnsa-Þóris saga
Original text and translation at the Icelandic Saga Database

Sagas of Icelanders